The Softball America Player of the Year is an award given by Wilson Sporting Goods to the best college softball player of the year. The award has been given annually since 2019.

Winners

References

Awards established in 2019
College softball player of the year awards in the United States